Matrika Prasad Yadav, is a Nepalese politician. He was the Industry, Commerce and Supplies Minister of Nepal in Second Oli cabinet and Minister of Land Reform in First Dahal cabinet. He is a leader of Nepal Communist Party. Yadav hosted the seventh ‘Made in Nepal’ expo in Lalitpur from 28–29 September 2019.

See also
List of Nepalese politicians

References

External links
Official website of Nepal Communist Party
Official website of Ministry of Industry, Commerce and Supplies

Living people
Nepal Communist Party (NCP) politicians
Place of birth missing (living people)
Nepal MPs 2017–2022
Madhesi people
People of the Nepalese Civil War
Members of the 1st Nepalese Constituent Assembly
Communist Party of Nepal (Maoist Centre) politicians
1958 births